John Wensink (born April 1, 1953) is a Canadian former professional ice hockey player, who played over 400 games in the National Hockey League (NHL), most prominently with the Boston Bruins. Wensink featured in back-to-back Stanley Cup Finals with the Bruins in 1977 and 1978.

Wensink grew up in Maxville, Ontario, the son of Dutch immigrants, and played for the Netherlands national ice hockey team in the 1989 World Ice Hockey Championships.

Career
Wensink is best remembered for his time with the Boston Bruins, where he teamed with Terry O'Reilly and Stan Jonathan as the team's enforcers. On December 1, 1977, Wensink, after fighting Alex Pirus of the Minnesota North Stars, skated to the Minnesota bench and challenged the entire team, but no player responded. Wensink is also well-known for the large afro that he sported on the ice. In another scrap with Bob Kelly, Wensink and Kelly were pulling at each other's hair.

Besides his skill as a fighter, Wensink could score as well. He had a career high 46 points in the 1978-79 season for the Bruins.

Wensink also played for the St. Louis Blues, Quebec Nordiques, the Colorado Rockies and the New Jersey Devils. He finished his career with the Nijmegen Tigers in the Dutch Eredivisie in 1984–85.

Post-playing career
After his playing career ended, Wensink moved to St. Charles, Missouri, and started a home renovation company, where he also plays senior hockey. Wensink has been active as a pee-wee hockey coach. He is still active with the St. Louis Blues Alumni and the Boston Bruins Alumni hockey teams.

Career statistics

References

External links

1953 births
Living people
Boston Bruins players
Canadian ice hockey left wingers
Canadian people of Dutch descent
Colorado Rockies (NHL) players
Cornwall Royals (QMJHL) players
Denver Spurs players
Dutch ice hockey left wingers
Geleen Smoke Eaters players
Ice hockey people from Ontario
New Jersey Devils players
New York Golden Blades draft picks
Nijmegen Tigers players
Quebec Nordiques players
Rochester Americans players
Sportspeople from Cornwall, Ontario
St. Louis Blues draft picks
St. Louis Blues players
Wichita Wind players